David Tucker may refer to:

 David Tucker (poet), American poet and news editor
 Dave Tucker (geologist), geologist in Washington state
 David Tucker (sailor) (born 1941), British Olympic sailor
 David W. Tucker (1929–2003), jazz trombonist, music educator and composer
 Dave Tucker (rugby league), rugby league footballer of the 1960s